The Marvel Comics character Iron Man has appeared in various other media since his debut in Tales of Suspense #39 (March 1963). Iron Man has been the focus of three animated series and a direct-to-DVD animated feature. An Iron Man live-action feature film starring Robert Downey Jr. as the character and directed by Jon Favreau was released in 2008, with Downey also appearing as the character in the two sequels Iron Man 2 and 3, in a cameo in The Incredible Hulk, and as a main character in several other films in the Marvel Cinematic Universe including The Avengers, Avengers: Age of Ultron, Captain America: Civil War, Spider-Man: Homecoming, Avengers: Infinity War, and Avengers: Endgame.

Television

1960s

Iron Man appeared in the 1966 series The Marvel Super Heroes where he was one of the five featured superheroes and was voiced by John Vernon.

1980s
 In 1981, Iron Man guest starred in Spider-Man and His Amazing Friends, voiced by William Marshall. He made cameo appearances throughout the series, most prominently in "The Origin of the Spider-Friends", where he is a central character. The Beetle stole a crime-detection computer and the Power Booster invented by Tony Stark to increase his power. He was the first villain that the Spider-Friends faced together in that origin episode. In gratitude for the Spider-Friends' aid against the Beetle, Stark provided them with the crime-detection technology used by the heroes throughout the series.
 Iron Man made a few cameo appearances with the rest of the Avengers in the 1981 solo Spider-Man show, on an in-universe cartoon in the episode "Arsenic and Aunt May", and as a costume in a costume shop in the episode "The Capture of Captain America".
An Iron Man TV series was one of several pitches in the 1980s and unaired pilot was produced in 1980.

1990s
 In 1994, Iron Man starred in the animated series Iron Man, voiced by Robert Hays. Iron Man served as part of a team consisting of Century, War Machine, the Scarlet Witch, Hawkeye, and Spider-Woman. This show was part of The Marvel Action Hour, which packaged several animated versions of Marvel series, including the 1994 Fantastic Four, with two half-hour episodes from different series. Iron Man's origin was changed for this series: Instead of shrapnel near his heart, Stark has multiple slivers near his spine, threatening paralysis. Stark and Yinsen are held captive not by Wong Chu but by the Mandarin, who had been altered by his rings to have green skin and a degree of super strength. The Mandarin leads a group of villains, consisting of Dreadknight, Hypnotia, Blizzard, Blacklash, the Grey Gargoyle, Whirlwind, the Living Laser, MODOK, and Justin Hammer against Iron Man and a team based on Force Works.
 Iron Man made a non-speaking cameo in some episodes of Fantastic Four.
 Iron Man appeared in the two part featuring Venom and Carnage episodes of the mid-1990s and episodes of Secret Wars chapter from the 1994 Spider-Man TV series with Robert Hays reprising the role.
 Robert Hays reprised the role again in a guest appearance in the 1996 animated series The Incredible Hulk in the episode "Helping Hand, Iron Fist".
 Iron Man appears in The Avengers: United They Stand episode "Shooting Stars", voiced by Francis Diakowsky. He helps the Avengers thwart the Zodiac's plan to send a radioactive satellite crashing to Earth.

2000s

 Iron Man appears in the Fantastic Four: World's Greatest Heroes episode "Shell Games", voiced by David Kaye.
 Iron Man is the main character in Iron Man: Armored Adventures, voiced by Adrian Petriw.
 Iron Man appears in The Super Hero Squad Show, voiced by Tom Kenny.

2010s
 Iron Man appears in The Avengers: Earth's Mightiest Heroes, voiced by Eric Loomis. As in the comics, he is one of the founding members of the team and provides them with the Avengers Mansion as well as all the team's technology, including special ID cards and Quinjets. This Iron Man includes the elements from the comics canon and some elements from the recent Iron Man film series, including the Arc Reactor in his chest as well as his armor being run by the J.A.R.V.I.S. A.I., as opposed to the HOMER system in the comics. He serves as team leader, and is seen in the opening credits monitoring the team's activities on various view screens.
 As part of a four-series collaboration between the Japanese Madhouse animation house and Marvel, Iron Man starred in a 12 episode anime series that premiered in Japan on Animax in October 2010 and is shown on G4 in the United States. It concluded on Animax after running the full dozen episodes on December 17, 2010.  He additionally appears in a non-speaking cameo in the final episode of Marvel Anime: X-Men.
 Iron Man appears in Ultimate Spider-Man, with Pasdar reprising his role. In the episode "Great Power", he is shown trying to master his suit. He has a major role in "Flight of the Iron Spider", where he and the team combat the Living Laser. The episode makes several references to his playboy persona. His background seems identical to the canon, with the first suit being built to escape captivity. An alternate version of him is briefly shown in the end, when the Living Laser ends up in the Super Hero Squad reality.
 Iron Man appears in Lego Marvel Super Heroes: Maximum Overload, once again voiced by Adrian Pasdar.
 Iron Man appears in Hulk and the Agents of S.M.A.S.H., once again voiced by Pasdar.
 Iron Man appears in the summer 2013 animated special Phineas and Ferb: Mission Marvel, with Pasdar reprising his role.
 Iron Man appears in Avengers Assemble, voiced once again by Pasdar. Mick Wingert was supposed to take over the role in Season 3, but instead Pasdar maintained it. Wingert eventually took over the role in Season 4.
 The Marvel Cinematic Universe version of Iron Man briefly appears via stock footage in the pilot episode of Agents of S.H.I.E.L.D. as Skye outlines public knowledge of superhumans.
 The president of Disney Channel Worldwide Gary Marsh announced a new Iron Man series is in development.
 Iron Man appears in the anime series Marvel Disk Wars: The Avengers, with Matthew Mercer reprising his role.
 Iron Man appears in the television special Lego Marvel Super Heroes: Avengers Reassembled, voiced by Mick Wingert.
 Iron Man appears in the Guardians of the Galaxy episodes "Stayin' Alive" and "Evolution Rock", voiced again by Mick Wingert.
 Iron Man appears in Spider-Man, voiced again by Mick Wingert. He briefly appeared in the episode "Stark Expo" where Peter Parker attends the Expo as Spider-Man mistaking him for an intruder, eventually joining Spider-Man in defeating the Ghost.
 Iron Man appears in the anime series Marvel Future Avengers, voiced by Eiji Hanawa in Japanese dubbed version. In the English dubbed version, he is reprised by Mick Wingert from various Marvel media.

2020s
 Iron Man appears in M.O.D.O.K. voiced by Jon Hamm. He makes sporadic appearances and MODOK considers him his arch-enemy. In "What Menace Doth the Mailman Deliver!", MODOK convinces Iron Man to buy A.I.M. from GRUMBL so that he and Monica Rappaccini can leave and start a new business.
 Iron Man appears in the Disney+ animated series What If...?, set in the Marvel Cinematic Universe. He is voiced by Mick Wingert, replacing Robert Downey Jr. from the films.
Iron Man appears in Spidey and His Amazing Friends, voiced by John Stamos.

Film

Animated

 Iron Man was featured in Ultimate Avengers, an animated direct-to-video adaptation of the Ultimates produced by Marvel Entertainment and Lions Gate Films, voiced by Marc Worden. Although based on Ultimate Iron Man, the animated version's identity is not a matter of public record, and, as in main Marvel Universe continuity, he is afflicted with a heart condition rather than a brain tumor. In the first film he is reluctant to join the Avengers, but later becomes a full-time member. Marvel/Lions Gate released Ultimate Avengers 2 on August 8, 2006. In the second film Iron Man's old armor is ruined, so he uses the War Machine armor.
 Marc Worden reprises his role of Iron Man in The Invincible Iron Man. The film has a slightly changed origin where Stark is taken to China. There he meets Li Mei, and with Rhodey builds a suit of armor. As Iron Man he takes down four elementals attempting to resurrect his arch enemy, the Mandarin, who in this incarnation is a Kahgan who has been deceased for many centuries.
 An elderly Iron Man appears in the alternate universe Next Avengers: Heroes of Tomorrow voiced by Tom Kane. He takes the children of the Avengers to a safe place where Ultron will not find them.
 Stark, voiced again by Marc Worden, makes a brief appearance in the Planet Hulk animated film.
 Iron Man: Rise of Technovore is a direct-to-video feature which, like the Marvel Anime adaptation, is produced by Madhouse in collaboration with Marvel. The feature is written by Brandon Auman and directed by Hiroshi Hamasaki in which Matthew Mercer voiced the character. The feature revolves around Iron Man as he fights against Ezekiel Stane who has developed a new bio-technology. The film was released in North America on Blu-ray and DVD April 16, 2013.
 Iron Man appears as a central character in Iron Man & Hulk: Heroes United which was released in 2014. Adrian Pasdar reprised his role as Stark from Ultimate Spider-Man and the Iron Man Anime. Iron Man will be teaming with Captain America in Iron Man & Captain America: Heroes United which was released in 2014.
 Iron Man appears in the anime film Avengers Confidential: Black Widow & Punisher with Mercer reprising his role.
 Iron Man appears in the animated film Marvel Super Hero Adventures: Frost Fight, with Mick Wingert reprising the role from Lego Marvel Super Heroes: Avengers Reassembled.
 Iron Man appears in Lego Marvel Super Heroes - Black Panther: Trouble in Wakanda, voiced again by Mick Wingert.
 Iron Man makes a cameo in the Walt Disney Animation Studios film, Ralph Breaks the Internet, where he is seen flying towards the Marvel pavilion of the Oh My Disney webpage, an act witnessed by Vanellope von Schweetz.

Marvel Cinematic Universe

Robert Downey Jr. portrays Tony Stark in Iron Man (2008), Iron Man 2 (2010), The Avengers (2012), Iron Man 3 (2013), Avengers: Age of Ultron (2015), Captain America: Civil War (2016), Spider-Man: Homecoming (2017), Avengers: Infinity War (2018), and Avengers: Endgame (2019), as well as having a cameo in The Incredible Hulk (2008) that is also shown via archive footage in the Marvel One-Shot, The Consultant (2011). Davin Ransom portrayed a young Tony Stark in Iron Man 2.

Video games
Iron Man is featured in several video games. 
He is one of four selectable heroes in Captain America and the Avengers (1991). 
 Iron Man appears in few Capcom games licensed by Marvel:
 Iron Man appears in few Marvel-licensed Capcom fighting games, particularly in Marvel vs. Capcom series.
 Chris Britton voices the character in the 2D era fighting games Marvel Super Heroes (1995) and in Marvel vs. Capcom 2: New Age of Heroes (2000).
 He is one of five playable characters in Marvel Super Heroes In War of the Gems (1996). Clones of Iron Man also appear as foot soldier enemies and bosses in this game.
 Eric Loomis reprises his role in 3D era Marvel vs. Capcom games:
 Iron Man appears as a playable fighter in Marvel vs. Capcom 3: Fate of Two Worlds, donning his Extremis armor. Alternate colors include the "tin can" prototype armor, the Stealth Suit, and the Silver Centurion armor, with Norman Osborn's Iron Patriot armor available as downloadable content. He appears in the Mike Haggar character ending as Haggar's running mate for his presidential campaign. Iron Man would later appear as a playable character in the standalone update of the game, Ultimate Marvel vs. Capcom 3.
 Iron Man is a playable character in Marvel vs. Capcom: Infinite, with Eric Loomis reprising the role. While not having much playable roles, Iron Man one of the important major characters in the storyline.
 Iron Man appears as an assist character in the 1995 arcade game Avengers in Galactic Storm.
 Iron Man/Tony Stark appears and referred in few Spider-Man games:
 Tony Stark is referenced in Spider-Man 2: Enter Electro.
 In Spider-Man: Web of Shadows, Spider-Man tries to call Tony Stark to help build a device that will rid the city of the symbiotes. Stark Industries is closed due to a public health emergency caused by the symbiote invasion. Billboards of Iron Man are seen across the city. Despite this, his Stark tower, located at South Financial District becomes the main base to shelter the survivors and separating the symbiote victims.
 In Spider-Man Unlimited, Nick Fury notes he would rather have Iron Man helping stop the Sinister Six instead of Spider-Man. Tony Stark is also mentioned in Iron Spider's backstory. The Marvel Cinematic Universe version of Iron Man also appears in the Avengers: Infinity War tie-in event, where he sends Spider-Man to Symbiote World to protect. the Power Stone.
 Marvel’s Iron Man VR is an upcoming video game which is being developed by Camouflaj. It will be released on the PlayStation 4.
 He appears in Iron Man and X-O Manowar in Heavy Metal for the PC, PlayStation, the Game Boy, Saturn and Game Gear.
 The Invincible Iron Man was released on the Game Boy Advance in late 2002.
 Iron Man is unlockable after beating the easy difficulty on Tony Hawk's Underground released in 2003.
 Iron Man makes an appearance in the 2005 Punisher video game voiced by John Cygan. He learns from his security that the Eternal Sun tried to steal the Iron Man armors. An inside joke alludes to Stark's alcoholism: After viewing the destruction left by the Punisher, Stark sighs and says, "I need a drink."
 Iron Man is an unlockable character in X-Men Legends II: Rise of Apocalypse voiced again by John Cygan. He can be unlocked by collecting the four homing beacons in each act to access the secret area to retrieve a piece of his armor. Collect four pieces of his armor to unlock him. The War Machine armor is one of his alternate costumes. He's the only playable non-mutant character to be mistaken as a mutant by Bastion and the Sentinel, and a member of the  X-Men. Due to fact, he himself been an old friend of the X-Men for long time.
 Iron Man is one of the main characters in Marvel Nemesis: Rise of the Imperfects, voiced by David Kaye.
 Iron Man is an important playable character in the spiritual successor of X-Men Legends series, Marvel: Ultimate Alliance:
 John Cygan reprises his role of Iron Man who is a playable character in Marvel: Ultimate Alliance. His costumes include his New Avenger armor, his Classic armor, the War Machine armor, and his Ultimate armor. Iron Man is one of the main characters in game; Stark Tower is one of the bases of the team in the game. He has special dialogue with Nick Fury, the Crimson Dynamo, Deathbird, Dark Colossus, and Dark Captain America. A simulation disk has Iron Man fighting Ultimo on the S.H.I.E.L.D. Helicarrier. He is also a PSP exclusive boss character on Black Widow's simulation mission in that handheld port.
 Iron Man return a playable character and a boss character in Marvel: Ultimate Alliance 2 voiced by Crispin Freeman. He is one of the first four characters available for play in the game, and one of the three major characters alongside Captain America and Nick Fury. Since the game's storyline is based on the Civil War story arc, he plays a major role as the leader of the Pro-Registration Movement. His alternate costume is a slightly modified classic costume.
 Iron Man appears as a playable character in a reboot universe depicted in Marvel Ultimate Alliance 3: The Black Order, with Eric Loomis reprising his role.
 Iron Man appears in a video game adaptions based on Phase 1 films of Marvel Cinematic Universe where Iron Man appeared prior to The Avengers movie:
 In 2008, Sega Corporation published an Iron Man video game in tandem with the release of the movie with Robert Downey Jr. reprising his role as Tony Stark and Iron Man voiced by Stephen Stanton.
 Stephen Stanton reprises his role of Iron Man in The Incredible Hulk video game. He serves as a boss and as a threat level enemy should the Hulk cause too much destruction. He fights the Hulk in his Hulkbuster Armor MK II. Iron Man's Hulkbuster Armor is playable if one has the data of the Iron Man video game on their memory card.
 Iron Man appears in the video game adaption of Iron Man 2 voiced by Eric Loomis.
 Iron Man is the main character in Iron Man: Aerial Assault.
 Iron Man appears as a playable character in the Marvel Super Hero Squad video game and its sequel, with Tom Kenny reprising his role.
 An Iron Man pinball machine produced by Stern was released in 2010. It is based on the first two feature films.
 Iron Man is available as downloadable content for the game LittleBigPlanet, as part of "Marvel Costume Kit 1".
 Iron Man is a playable character in Marvel Super Hero Squad Online and Marvel Super Hero Squad: Comic Combat, voiced by Tom Kenny in his standard armor, Hulkbuster armor and Stealth armor.
 Iron Man is a playable character in the Facebook game Marvel: Avengers Alliance.
 Iron Man appears as a playable character in the 2012 fighting game Marvel Avengers: Battle for Earth.
 Iron Man is a playable character in the MMORPG Marvel Heroes, voiced by Marc Worden.
 Iron Man is a playable character in every Lego Marvel games such as Lego Marvel Super Heroes, Lego Marvel's Avengers and Lego Marvel Super Heroes 2, voiced by  Adrian Pasdar, Robert Downey Jr. and John Schwab respectively.
 Iron Man is a playable character in Marvel Avengers Alliance Tactics.
 Iron Man is a playable character in Marvel: Contest of Champions. His Endo-Sym armor and Hulkbuster armor also appear as separate characters.
 Iron Man is a playable character in Disney Infinity: Marvel Super Heroes, voiced again by Adrian Pasdar. His Hulkbuster armor is added as a separate character in the 3.0 edition also voiced by Adrian Pasdar from various Marvel media.
 Iron Man is a playable character in Marvel: Future Fight.
 A teenage version of Iron Man appears in Marvel Avengers Academy, voiced by Dave Franco.
 Iron Man appears in Marvel Battle Lines, voiced again by Mick Wingert.
 Iron Man VR is an upcoming virtual reality game for PS4.
 Iron Man is a playable character in Marvel's Avengers with Nolan North voicing the role.
 Iron Man is a playable character in Marvel Future Revolution, voiced again by Eric Loomis. Many other versions of Tony Stark from alternate realities also appear as NPCs, such as the one who was then transformed New York City into the technologically advanced "New Stark City" or one who led an unsuccessful rebellion against Maestro on Sakaar.
 Iron Man appears in Fortnite Battle Royale Chapter 2, Season 4, titled "Nexus War" as both Tony Stark and Iron Man. His suit is the last reward of the Season's Battle Pass and is mostly responsible for defeating Galactus during the "Devourer of Worlds" live event in-game.
 Iron Man is a playable character in Marvel's Midnight Suns, voiced by Josh Keaton. In this version, Tony works in the Abbey's forge along with Doctor Strange to upgrade the heroes' gear. He attempts to destroy the last page of the Darkhold with a gamma gun, only to turn a brainwashed Bruce Banner into Smart Hulk, who steals the page for Lilith. If Tony builds a friendship with Hunter, he opens up to learning about magic and decides to found an R&D department to study the arcane for potential benefits to humanity.
 An untitled, third-person action-adventure game starring the character is currently being developed by Motive Studio and is being published by Electronic Arts.

Motion comics
Iron Man appears in the Iron Man: Extremis motion comic, voiced by Jason Griffith.
Iron Man appears in the Ultimate Wolverine vs. Hulk motion comic, voiced by Kirby Morrow.
Iron Man appears in the Eternals motion comic, voiced again by Kirby Morrow.

Books
The Iron Man armor is prominently featured in the book Inventing Iron Man: The Possibility of a Human Machine  by E. Paul Zehr, which explores the hard science fiction aspects of Iron Man and the possibility of building an Iron Man-like armor.

Iron Man has appeared in the following novels:

Theatre
Iron Man appears in the Marvel Universe Live! stage show.

Unreleased projects
In 1989, while the third TV-movie sequel to The Incredible Hulk live-action television series was expected to co-star She-Hulk, Iron Man was being considered for both a follow-up or a solo film of his own. One year later, a film from Universal Studios to be directed by Stuart Gordon was being negotiated. This was still on the table ten months later, and also another two years on, this time with no specific director or even studio attached.

Amusement park
 On October 8, 2013, Walt Disney Parks and Resorts chairman Thomas O. Staggs announced that Hong Kong Disneyland would be adding the Iron Man Experience, becoming the first Disney attraction to be based on a Marvel property. Set at the fictional Stark Expo, the attraction will feature Tony Stark recruiting guests to fend off extraterrestrial beings from attacking Hong Kong.

References

External links
 Toymania: Iron Man Figure Archive